Blacklist International is a Southeast Asian esports organization under Tier One Entertainment. They manage competitive esports divisions in PUBG, Mobile Legends: Bang Bang, Garena Free Fire, Call of Duty: Mobile , and collaboration between Rivalry in Dota 2 and G2 Esports in League of Legends: Wild Rift.

Mobile Legends: Bang Bang

History 
Blacklist International's Mobile Legends represents the Philippines. The team traces its roots to SxC Imbalance, which was acquired by EVOS Esports of Indonesia. The roster was absorbed by Blacklist after dissolution of EVOS Philippines due to alleged corruption in the organization.

Mobile Legends: Bang-Bang Professional League (MPL-PH)

Season 5 
Tier One Entertainment bought some of Evos Philippines' roster and rebranded it as Blacklist International. They were dominant initially, but the teams began to adjust their gamestyles, resulting in the development of counters and methods that defeated Blacklist. They finished sixth place, just ahead of SGD Omega.

Season 6 
During the sixth season of MPL PH, Blacklist International would acquire veteran Mark Jayson "ESON" Gerardo ,after a short break from Season 5, and FULLCLIP (now known as Kairi). Blacklist International finished the regular season as the third seed in Group A, with a 3–2 and 8–5 match win–loss result. The team would go on to lose their contention for the championship after getting defeated by Smart Omega in five games.

Season 7 

During the offseason of the recently concluded MPL PH season 6, Blacklist began making moves to reorganize and remake their roster before the start of season 7. One notable change that is still felt today is the acquisition of Johnmar "OhMyV33NUS" Villaluna and Danerie "Wise." Del Rosario, known as the "VeeWise Tandem" from ONIC Philippines in exchange for FULLCLIP (now known as Kairi "Kairi" Rayosdelsol.). Despite the move being called out as "Unfair" for ONIC PH that lost two of their stars, this would be a massive turning point at the start of MPL Philippines season 7 and season 8. Blacklist would also pick up Kiel Calvin "OHEB" Soriano, a promising rookie for non-turtle lane. Due to her natural leadership and shot-calling ability, OhMY33NUS was appointed as the Captain of the team going in on Season 7.

The new roster dominated the regular season—losing once against the defending world champions, BREN Esports, in Week 5. The team tallied 25-7 W/L record for games, and a 12-1 W/L standing, ending the regular season as the first seed. In the playoffs, Blacklist International would win their first matchup and rematch against the league's defending champions, Bren Esports, in a five game thriller. The team survived the Hack-a-V33nus strategy of the defending champions, 3-2. In the second round of the Upper Bracket, the team defeated Aura Philippines, formerly SunSparks, sealing their spot into the Grand Finals and one of the MSC spots. Execration would meet Blacklist in the finals as one of the most hyped up matches in MPL PH history. Blacklist would go on to suffer a 2-0 deficit in the hands of Smart Omega. In Game 3, Smart Omega opened one of OhMyV33nus' signature picks, Mathilda, partnered with Wise's Brody, the team dominated the early game and went on to secure their first win of the series. They went on to lose the next game shifting the mood to a do-or-die. The team found their footing in Game 5 with the surprise Faramis pick. The team rode the momentum of the Game 5 win and won Game 6. The score was tied, 3-3. The final game was a winner-take-all, best-of-one match. The fans and the casters alike were surprised when the team brought out the Aldous—an unconventional pick given how Wise was the only player to use the hero in the Jungle. The team would survive various clashes with the help of the captain's signature Estes pick. Oheb on his Harith and Edward on his Paquito, and Eson on the Rafaela, it solidified the toughness and effectiveness of the Healing-Galing Meta/the UBE strat, wherein sustain heroes would be protecting and healing the damage dealers and the turtle lane hero would act as the second tank. The team was looking to win as they were sieging in the base of Omega. But the winning moment was stopped as Kelra on his Lunox made a Savage, a five-man wipeout. Blacklist International maintained their composure and won the last teamfight. They won the first seven-game-grand finals in the MPL PH against Smart Omega, 4-3. Following their win, they were crowned as the MPL PH Season 7 Champions. Edward is hailed as the Season MVP.

Season 8 

Blacklist International would recoup and compete for the Eight Season of the Mobile Legends: Bang Bang Professional League in the Philippines as one of the most-feared teams with the addition of Salic "Hadjizy" Imam. Blacklist International would maintain a dominant performance and standing within the competition, going 11-0 undefeated until it took their first lost to ONIC Philippines, the only team that managed to beat Blacklist International in the competition. Blacklist International would finish 13-1 and 26-7 Games Win and Loses, winning over Bren Esports for their final regular season game.

In the Playoffs, Blacklist International would be put into Match 4 in the Upper-Bracket. Blacklist would eventually lose 3–1 against Smart Omega, lowering them to the lower-bracket. This was partially due to the suspension of their player Kiel Calvin "OHEB" Soriano after pulling up a middle finger after their regular season win over Smart Omega. Blacklist International would defeat both NEXPLAY EVOS and Smart OMEGA in the Lower Bracket competitions in a 3-0 and 3–1 series, respectively, putting them in the position of obtaining back-to-back titles. In the Finals, they would face off ONIC Philippines. Blacklist International would be named Champions of MPL Philippines Season 8 after defeating ONIC Philippines in 5 Games. Blacklist International is the second team in MPL Philippines History to win back-to-back titles, the other being Sunsparks for Seasons 4 and 5.

Season 9 

On 9 January 2022, the dynamic duo of "VeeWise" has announced along with the management, that they will be taking a break and would not compete in the upcoming MPL Philippines Season 9. However, both OhmyV33nus and Wise have confirmed that they will be making a return for MPL Philippines Season 10 and would still be under Tier One Entertainment.

On 13 January 2022, a roster reveal poster was released by Blacklist International, showing the three MVPs in Kiel Calvin "OHEB" Soriano, Edward Jay "EDWARD" Dapadap, and Salic "Hadji" A. Imam, with two new players with the caption "A veteran who's still got some fuel left in the tank" and "a brand new face who's gonna shake things up". A day later, the official roster was announced and that Mark Jayson "ESON" Gerardo, will be joining the roster again, alongside a new rookie Kent Xavier "KEVIER" Lopez as the new Jungler of the team.

Upon opening the Season on 18 February 2022, Blacklist would go and open the season with a matchup against the M3 runner-up in ONIC Philippines however, Blacklist would fall in a 1–2 series opening to ONIC. After a 2-week struggle, Blacklist International would score their first series win against Bren Esports in a 2–0 sweep.

Season 11 
On February 6, 2023 Blacklist announced in their social media account about the temporary break in the pro-scene of current three-time champion in MPL Philippines and M4 world champion coach, Kristoffer "Bon Chan". On Blacklist twitter page, they announced that coach "Bon Chan" will taking rest this season 11 of the MPL Philippines after continuous coaching of Blacklist International both local and international tournaments since season 7. Blacklist also announced on their twitter page about the revamp of the current roster of MPL's Blacklist International featuring three old and new rosters. Following the announcement of temporary break of coach Kristoffer "Bon Chan", Blacklist International's MPL-PH offlaner, Salic “Hadji” Imam will skip the MPL Philippines Season 11 together with his teammate Mark Jayson "Eson"  with their coach, Kristofer "Bon Chan" and Blacklist International's general manager, "Boss Rada".

Mobile Legends: Bang Bang Southeast Asia Cup 

Prior to the cancellation of MSC 2020, MPL Philippines Season 7 was still continued as planned with minor postpone schedules in the process. This would eventually lead up to a Blacklist-Execration battle that would ultimately favor Blacklist International, giving it its first Championship Title. This also led to Blacklist International and the eventual runner-up Execration to represent the Philippines in the regional competition MSC 2021 in Singapore. Both Blacklist and Execration faced off juggernaut teams in the region, including M1 Champions EVOS Legends and Bigetron Alpha, and qualifying teams and champions of their respective MPL Competitions in EVOS Singapore, TODAK Malaysia, RSG Singapore, Impunity KH, Nightmare Esports, and Cybe EXE.

Blacklist International would sweep Bigetron Alpha for their first matchup and one of the dominating games Blacklist has put on a show. Blacklist would as well defeat in a sweep, Impunity KH the following day. Blacklist International, alongside RSG Malaysia, EVOS Legends and Execration would end up in the Upper-Bracket with the first competitions in the Lower-Bracket being Bigetron Alpha, TODAK, Impunity KH and EVOS Singapore. Blacklist International would seal their positions and spot in MSC 2021 with a 3–0 sweep against EVOS Legends. Blacklist would meet Execration in a Rematch in the finals, however, the title would eventually go to Execration, finishing the series in 4–1.

Mobile Legends: Bang Bang World Championships

MLBB M3 World Championship 
After their finish as the second team to win back-to-back MPL Philippines titles for Season 7 and Season 8, Blacklist International avenged their loss over the now-Smart Omega roster from MSC 2021. Alongside MPL Philippines Season 8's runner-up in ONIC Philippines, both teams would represent the Philippines in the MLBB M3 World Championship in Singapore.

Coming of a strong finish in the group stage, going undefeated, Blacklist sealed their spot in the first bracket-matchup on the upper-bracket's first round where they would face-off the North American-representatives in BloodThirstyKings (stylized as BTK). After an unexpected Game 1 loss to BTK, Blacklist would fall short, losing to the dark-horse team in a 2-3 matchup, favouring BTK.

Blacklist International would face-off ONIC Esports in the lower-bracket second round after they defeated Team SMG of Malaysia. Blacklist would defeat ONIC Esports in a close 2-1 matchup series, advancing to the next rounds where they proceeded to eliminate: Vivo Keyd of Brazil, RRQ Hoshi of Indonesia, and EVOS SG of Singapore. They would face a rematch with BTK in the lower-bracket finals, after BTK fell short to ONIC Philippines. Blacklist staged a revenge tour, winning the series 3-1 and sealing their Grand Finals spot. The first all-Philippine Grand Finals since Indonesia in the MLBB M1 World Championships. Blacklist would dominate ONIC, sweeping the team in the Grand Finals, the first sweep by any team thus far.

Kiel Calvin "OHEB" Soriano was awarded the Finals MVP award and was nicknamed as the "Filipino Sniper" for his smooth and perfect execution with marksmen heroes such as the Beatrix.

SIBOL 2022

31st Southeast Asian Games 
The Philippines' esports lineup for the game Mobile Legends: Bang Bang is picked by qualifying rounds for the SIBOL National Team. A total of six teams were invited by SIBOL to participate in the qualifying tournaments, including ECHO Philippines, Bren Esports, RSG Philippines, Omega Esports, Onic Philippines and Nexplay EVOS.

Blacklist International would defeat Bren Esports with a 2–1 series victory. Blacklist would face-off Nexplay EVOS where only 2 games were ever broadcast as Nexplay was not able to play the first game due to a sudden illness of their player H2WO and was immediately sent to the hospital. In the vlog of AkoSiDogie, it was revealed that the officials of 2021 Southeast Asian Games for Mobile Legends had overruled the team's request to temporarily postpone the match against Blacklist due to the lack of substituting players. It was ultimately decided that Blacklist would gain a 1–0 lead. Blacklist would sweep Nexplay in a 3–0 series and would sweep RSG Philippines in the upper-bracket finals, losing only 1 game.

Blacklist International and Nexplay EVOS would rematch against each other, but Blacklist would ultimately win the series in a 4–1 game.

The Philippines was grouped with Malaysia, Laos, and Myanmar in the group stage. The Philippines asserted its dominance over the group stage with three of the world championship roster players in the line-up and two aspiring rookies. They were able to sweep Malaysia, Laos, and Myanmar and was set to face-off Singapore in the Playoffs, winning their tiebreaker game against team Vietnam. Despite a shocking Game 1 loss by the team, Blacklist was able to pull off a 2–1 victory, assuring the team a silver medal. In the Grand Finals, a rematch was set between the Philippines and Indonesia because previously, the Philippines won over Indonesia in the 2019 Southeast Asian Games, securing them the gold medal. Despite fierce and tough competition, Blacklist International was able to win the Gold, securing the team's dominance and repeating as gold medalists for the Mobile Legends: Bang Bang tournament.

IESF Bali 2022 
The Philippine esport team, SIBOL participates in the 14th International Esports Federation tournament held in Nusa Dua, Bali, Indonesia on the 9-day event started from December 3–12. On the first day of the event, the Philippine team faces the Indonesia on the quarterfinal of upper bracket, defeated in a 0-2 match.  At the lower bracket the Philippine team faces the Argentina and Malaysia successfully defeated at 2–0 score facing the Cambodia team and ended in a 2-0 clean sweep in favor of the Philippines team. The Philippine team once again faces the team Indonesia in the grand finals but due to the IESF ruling, the Indonesian team automatically secured the first match after winning the upper bracket making way in 0–3 defeat of the Philippine Team.

Current roster

Mobile Legends: Bang-Bang Development League (MDL-PH)

Season 1 
On January 30, 2023 Blacklist International announced their upcoming roster team named "Blacklist Academy", in the Philippine franchise of Mobile Legends: Bang Bang Development League (MDL),  It is composed of young players that will play under the same banner of Blacklist organization.

Current roster

League of Legends : Wild Rift 
The European esports team G2 Esports and Southeast Asian esports Blacklist announced on February 15, 2023 the joint collaboration between two esports organization to form  League of Legends: Wild Rift  team, G2 Blacklist. The Tier One Entertainment and G2 Esports plans to launch documentary about the journey of the Wild Rift squad which will premier on the Tier One studios. The G2 Blacklist will debuting on the phase 2 qualifiers of Wild Rift League Asia on February 17, 2023.

Garena Free Fire
Blacklist International's Garena Free Fire team represents Malaysia. It was originally competed as Argon Baby prior to Tier One's acquisition of the esports team in 2021.

Call of Duty: Mobile
Under a partnership made with Philippine esports firm Ultimate E-Pro in September 2021, Blacklist International maintains a Call of Duty: Mobile (CODM) team known as Blacklist International.Ultimate. The team will enter the 2021 Call of Duty: Mobile World Championships.

Rosters

Dota 2 
On December 4, 2022, Blacklist executives Tryke Gutierez and Alodia Gosiengfiao officially introduced the new esports division in Dota 2, Blacklist Rivalry a partnership together with the Rivalry, an online company that specialize in sports and e-sports betting. During the event, the first thing introduced was the team's jersey with black and orange coming from Blacklist and Rivalry where inspired by the TNC's color and the binary code in Rivalry logo which translates to "PHOENIX", in reference to former TNC reborn team. On November 24, 2022, with new established team, Tier One Entertainment announced the newly acquired all-star Filipino Dota 2 rosters and expected to compete in the 2023 Dota Pro Circuit after purchasing Resurgence Esports (RSG).

Rosters

Controversy 
Kiel "Oheb" Soriano, a player of Blacklist International, was suspended for two matches and fined $500 (≈PHP 25,000) after flashing middle finger after 2–0 victory against the Smart Omega last 9 October 2021. The recent statement of MPL-Philippines Operating Committee said that it "does not tolerate any form of abusive behavior in the league and we expect our professional players to follow a strict code of conduct." The rivalry between the two teams started since back Season 7 and heated after the homophobic statement of Smart Omega player Duane "Kelra" Pillas against the VeeWise duo.

References

Esports teams based in the Philippines
Esports teams based in Malaysia
Mobile Legends: Bang Bang teams